The Green Valley Homestead is a historic farm complex at 2605 Sturkie Road in rural Fulton County, Arkansas, northwest of Salem. All of these buildings are built using materials from the property, including fieldstone for the foundations and logs for many of the structural elements of the buildings. They were built between about 1936 and 1943, and are a rare example of the Rustic architectural style in a residential/agricultural settings.

A  portion of the property was listed on the National Register of Historic Places in 2018.

See also
National Register of Historic Places listings in Fulton County, Arkansas

References

Houses on the National Register of Historic Places in Arkansas
Houses in Fulton County, Arkansas
National Register of Historic Places in Fulton County, Arkansas